Taylor Made Jazz is an album by American jazz pianist Billy Taylor. It was recorded in Chicago on November 17, 1957 and released by the Argo label. The album includes members of Duke Ellington's orchestra performing arrangements by Johnny Pate.

Reception

Allmusic awarded the album 3 stars stating: "though this isn't one of those small Ellingtonian unit sessions, it's just about the next best thing. Having assembled several members of Duke's band and written eight definitely Duke-influenced tunes, pianist/composer Billy Taylor's Taylor Made Jazz would probably have been marketed as a 'tribute album' if it had been released recently".

Track listing
All compositions by Billy Taylor
 "Biddy's Beat"
 "Theodora"
 "Mood for Mendes"
 "Daddy-O" 
 "Cu-Blu"
 "Day Dreaming"
 "Can You Tell by Looking at Me"
 "Tune Up!"

Personnel 
 Billy Taylor – piano
 Willie Cook – trumpet
 Clark Terry – trumpet
 Britt Woodman – trombone
 Johnny Hodges – alto saxophone
 Paul Gonsalves – tenor saxophone
 Harry Carney – baritone saxophone
 Earl May – double bass
 Ed Thigpen – drums

References 

1959 albums
Billy Taylor albums
Argo Records albums